Cyperus rotundus (coco-grass, Java grass, nut grass, purple nut sedge or purple nutsedge, red nut sedge, Khmer kravanh chruk) is a species of sedge (Cyperaceae) native to Africa, southern and central Europe (north to France and Austria), and southern Asia. The word cyperus derives from the Greek , kyperos, and rotundus is from Latin, meaning "round". The earliest attested form of the word cyperus is the Mycenaean Greek , ku-pa-ro, written in Linear B syllabic script.

Description
The names "nut grass" and "nut sedge" – shared with the related species Cyperus esculentus – are derived from its tubers, that somewhat resemble nuts, although botanically they have nothing to do with nuts.

The flower stems have a triangular cross-section. The flower is bisexual and has three stamina and a three-stigma pistil, with the inflorescence having three to eight unequal spikes. The fruit is a three-angled achene.

Some rhizomes grow upward in the soil, then form a bulb-like structure from which new shoots and roots grow, and from the new roots, new rhizomes grow. Other rhizomes grow horizontally or downward, and form dark reddish-brown tubers or chains of tubers.

History

C. rotundus was part of a set of starchy tuberous sedges that may have been eaten by Pliocene hominins. Biomarkers and microscopic evidence of C. rotundus are present in human dental calculus found at the Al Khiday archaeological complex in central Sudan dating from before 6700 BC to the Meroitic pre-Islamic Kingdom of 300–400 AD.  It is suggested that C. rotundus consumption may have contributed to the relatively low frequency of dental caries among the Meroitic population of Al Khiday because of its ability to inhibit Streptococcus mutans.

C. rotundus was employed in ancient Egypt, Mycenean Greece, and elsewhere as an aromatic and to purify water. It was used by ancient Greek physicians Theophrastus, Pliny the Elder, and Dioscorides as both medicine and perfume.

Ecology
It prefers dry conditions, but will tolerate moist soils, and often grows in wastelands and in crop fields.

The tubers are an important nutritional source of minerals and trace elements for migrating cranes.

Uses

C. rotundus has many beneficial uses. It is a staple carbohydrate in tropical regions for modern hunter-gatherers and is a famine food in some agrarian cultures.

Folk medicine
In traditional Chinese medicine, C. rotundus is considered the primary qi-regulating herb.

The plant is mentioned in the ancient Indian ayurvedic medicine Charaka Samhita (circa 100 AD). Modern ayurvedic medicine uses the plant, known as musta or musta moola churna, for fevers, digestive system disorders, dysmenorrhea, and other maladies.

Ayurvedic physicians use the plant for medicinal purposes in treating fevers, digestive system disorders, dysmenorrhea and other maladies. Modern alternative medicine recommends using the plant to treat nausea, fever and inflammation; for pain reduction; for muscle relaxation and for many other disorders.

Arabs of the Levant traditionally use roasted tubers, while they are still hot, or hot ashes from burned tubers, for wounds, bruises, and carbuncles.  Western and Islamic herbalists including Dioscorides, Galen, Serapion, Paulus Aegineta, Avicenna, Rhazes, and Charles Alston have described its use as a stomachic, emmenagogue, and deobstruent, and in emollient plasters.

The antibacterial properties of the tubers may have helped prevent tooth decay in people who lived in Sudan 2000 years ago. Less than 1% of that local population's teeth had cavities, abscesses, or other signs of tooth decay, though those people were probably farmers (early farmers' teeth typically had more tooth decay than those of hunter-gatherers because the high grain content in their diet created a hospitable environment for bacteria that flourish in the human mouth, excreting acids that eat away at the teeth).

Modern uses and studies
Several chemical substances have been identified in C. rotundus: cadalene, cyprotene, flavonoids, sesquiterpenes, terpenoids, mustakone, isocyperol, acyperone, rotundene, valecine, kaempferol, luteolin, quercetin, patchoulenone, isopatchoulenone, sugeonyl acetate, cellulose triacetate and sugebiol. A sesquiterpene, rotundone, so called because it was originally extracted from the tuber of this plant, is responsible for the spicy aroma of black pepper and the peppery taste of certain Australian Shiraz wines.

Extract from leaves and tubers of Cyperus rotundus L. increase the adventitious rooting of different species. These extracts contain a large amount of auxins and phenolic compounds that promote the rooting of cuttings and seedlings.

Food

Despite the bitter taste of the tubers, they are edible and have nutritional value. Some part of the plant was eaten by humans between Mesolithic and Neolithic periods. The plant has a high amount of carbohydrates. The plant is eaten in Rajasthan in famine-stricken areas.

Sleeping mats
The well dried coco grass is used in mats for sleeping.

Invasive problems and eradication

Cyperus rotundus is one of the most invasive weeds known, having spread out to a worldwide distribution in tropical and temperate regions. It has been called "the world's worst weed" as it is known as a weed in over 90 countries, and infests over 50 crops worldwide. In the United States it occurs from Florida north to New York and Minnesota and west to California and most of the states in between. In the uplands of Cambodia, it is described as an important agricultural weed.

Its existence in a field significantly reduces crop yield, both because it is a tough competitor for ground resources, and because it is allelopathic, the roots releasing substances harmful to other plants. Similarly, it also has a bad effect on ornamental gardening. The difficulty to control it is a result of its intensive system of underground tubers, and its resistance to most herbicides. It is also one of the few weeds that cannot be stopped with plastic mulch.

Weed pulling in gardens usually results in breakage of roots, leaving tubers in the ground from which new plants emerge quickly. Ploughing distributes the tubers in the field, worsening the infestation; even if the plough cuts up the tubers to pieces, new plants can still grow from them. In addition, the tubers can survive harsh conditions, further contributing to the difficulty to eradicate the plant. Hoeing in traditional agriculture of South East Asia does not remove the plant but leads to rapid regrowth.

Most herbicides may kill the plant's leaves, but most have no effect on the root system and the tubers. Glyphosate will kill some of the tubers (along with most other plants) and repeated application can be successful. Halosulfuron-methyl will control nut grass after repeated applications without damaging lawns. The plant does not tolerate shading and 2,4-dichlorophenoxyacetic acid (2,4-D) slows its growth in pastures and mulch crops.

See also 
 List of Cyperus species

References

External links

Flora Europaea: Cyperus rotundus
USDA Plants Profile: Cyperus rotundus
USDA Natural Resources Conservation Service: Cyperus rotundus (pdf file)
Use in Chinese and Ayurvedic medicine
A Tel-Aviv University study mentioning its nutritional importance for migrating birds (in Hebrew)
 Contains a detailed section on Cyperus rotundus, as well as a discussion of health benefits and Ayurvedic usage. Available online at https://web.archive.org/web/20110616192931/http://www.toddcaldecott.com/index.php/herbs/learning-herbs/310-musta

rotundus
Flora of Africa
Flora of temperate Asia
Flora of tropical Asia
Flora of Europe
Bushfood
Medicinal plants of Africa
Medicinal plants of Europe
Plants used in Ayurveda
Plants used in traditional Chinese medicine
Plants described in 1753
Taxa named by Carl Linnaeus